Kvikkjokk is a small village situated in Jokkmokk Municipality, Norrbotten County, Sweden. It is located 120 km northwest of Jokkmokk. Several hiking trails start in Kvikkjokk. Kungsleden passes through the village and it is a popular starting point for hikers going into Sarek National Park.

Climate
Kvikkjokk has a subarctic climate (Köppen Dfc). It is one of the most continental climates of the Nordics, with  summer highs and  winter lows in terms of averages. Areas to its north that share the proximity to the Norwegian border have greater maritime moderation with milder winters and quite a bit cooler summers. Kvikkjokk instead is quite reminiscent of Lapland's largest town Kiruna in terms of climate, only with wider temperature swings.

References 

Populated places in Jokkmokk Municipality
Lapland (Sweden)